Oates Piedmont Glacier is an extensive lowland piedmont ice sheet east of the Kirkwood Range, occupying the whole of the coastal platform between the Fry and Mawson Glaciers in Victoria Land. Surveyed in 1957 and named by the New Zealand Northern Survey Party of the Commonwealth Trans-Antarctic Expedition (1956–58) after Captain Lawrence E.G. Oates who, with Captain Scott and three companions, perished on the return from the South Pole in 1912.

Glaciers of Victoria Land
Scott Coast